Casper De Norre (born 7 February 1997) is a Belgian professional footballer who plays for Oud-Heverlee Leuven in the Belgian First Division A, as a full back.

Club career
De Norre started his career with Sint-Truiden.

On 4 January 2019, De Norre returned to his former youth club, K.R.C. Genk, on a 4.5-year contract.

Honours
Genk
Belgian First Division Winner: 2018–19

References

External links

1997 births
Living people
Association football defenders
Belgian footballers
Belgium under-21 international footballers
Belgium youth international footballers
Belgian Pro League players
Sint-Truidense V.V. players
A.S. Verbroedering Geel players
K.R.C. Genk players
Oud-Heverlee Leuven players